Christoph Schaffrath (1709 in Hohnstein  7 February 1763 in Berlin) was a German musician and composer of the late Baroque to Classical transition era.

Career
Schaffrath was born in Hohnstein.  He applied to be organist at the Sophienkirche in Dresden, but did not receive this position (Wilhelm Friedemann Bach was favoured for it). He did serve in the court of the Crown Prince Frederick (Frederick the Great) as a harpsichordist in the orchestra. From 1741, however, he was strictly the musician to the King's sister, Amalia.

As a composer Schaffrath limited himself to instrumental music including symphonies, keyboard pieces, sonatas and concertos. Schaffrath's music can be considered transitional, including pieces which are stylistically galant (between the Baroque and the Classical). The majority of his works may now be found in the state library in Berlin.

He composed many types of music. He was most notable for overtures, symphonies, harpsichord concerti, quartets, trios, duets for a solo instrument and obbligato harpsichord, and sonatas for harpsichord.

External links

1709 births
1763 deaths
18th-century classical composers
18th-century German people
German Baroque composers
German Classical-period composers
People from Sächsische Schweiz-Osterzgebirge
German male classical composers
18th-century German composers
18th-century German male musicians